Arien, Ariën, Ariens, Ariëns or Arienne may refer to the following

Given name
Ariën Pietersma (born 1987), Dutch football
Ariën van Weesenbeek (born 1980), Dutch drummer
Arienne Dwyer, American professor

Other People
Jan Ariens Duif (c. 1617 – 1649), Dutch painter

Other
Al-Arien, Syrian village
"Arienne", 1993 Tasmin Archer song
Ariens, American manufacturer of snow blowers, lawn tractors and zero-turn lawn mowers 
Ariëns Kappers Medal, scientific honor

See also
Arian (disambiguation)
Aryan (name)
Aaryan